Rheobates palmatus is a species of frog in the family Aromobatidae. It is the type species of genus Rheobates erected in 2006. Its common name is palm rocket frog. It is endemic to Colombia. It is considered to be part of a species complex.

Description
Rheobates palmatus has cryptic, brown or gray dorsal colouration and posteriorly granular skin texture. Toe webbing is extensive.  It is also distinguishable by its large size. Its tadpoles are also large and are a uniform colour without markings.

Distribution and habitat
It has been found that the vocalisations of the males when seeking a mate varies between the different populations. It is a terrestrial species and is found in rainforests and cloud forests. In the Rio Magdalena Valley it is also found in pasture land, crops and even polluted streams.

Status
Rheobates palmatus does not like being disturbed by humans. Near the Villavicencio–Bogotá road it became locally extinct but returned to its previous breeding sites when a new road was built, removing the traffic away from the old highway. The IUCN Red List of Threatened Species lists this species as being of "Least Concern" on the grounds that it has a reasonably wide range and a stable population, and seems to be an adaptable species.

References

palmatus
Amphibians of the Andes
Amphibians of Colombia
Endemic fauna of Colombia
Amphibians described in 1899
Taxa named by Franz Werner
Taxonomy articles created by Polbot